The Forgotten Man may refer to:

Forgotten man, a concept used in American political rhetoric
The Forgotten Man, a 2010 painting by Jon McNaughton
The Forgotten Man: A New History of the Great Depression, a 2007 book by Amity Shlaes
The Forgotten Man (novel), a 2005 Elvis Cole novel by Robert Crais
The Forgotten Man (1971 TV film), a 1971 TV film
The Forgotten Man (1941 film), a 1941 Robert Benchley short
The Forgotten Man (radio address), a 1932 radio address given by Franklin Roosevelt
The Forgotten Man, and Other Essays, a collection of essays by William Graham Sumner
 Forgotten Man (album), a 1981 album by jazz saxophonist Lou Donaldson